Kalpavriksham is a 1978 Indian Malayalam-language film,  directed by Hariharan  and produced by T. K. K. Nambiar. The film stars Prem Nazir, Jayan, Jayabharathi, Bhavani, and M. G. Soman .

Radha is in search for the person Gopi who cheated her twin sister Radhika, and Vasu who handled all their properties by trick. So she pretended and renamed her as a business tycoon Mayadevi in the cheaters hotel. There she meets Rajendhran, who accompanies her for revenge and to take back the properties. But there is a big twist when Rajendhran realises that his brother Surendhran is also a part of Gopi and Vasu's Gang.

Cast

Prem Nazir as Rajendran
Jayan as Gopi
Jayabharathi as Radhika, Radha(double role) Mayadevi
Jagathy Sreekumar as Saimon
Sukumaran as Ajayan/Vasu
M. G. Soman as Surendran
Unnimary as Rama
Adoor Bhasi as Judo/Ajayan
Bhavani as Sreedevi 
Thikkurissy Sukumaran Nair as Sankaran Menon
Sreelatha Namboothiri as Phalgunani
T. R. Omana as Devakiyamma
K. P. Ummer as Menon Radha's and Radhikas father
((Bahadur))as Shankara Pilla
((Meena))as Nani

Soundtrack
The music was composed by V. Dakshinamoorthy and the lyrics were written by Sreekumaran Thampi and Chirayinkeezhu Ramakrishnan Nair.

References

External links
 

1978 films
1970s Malayalam-language films
Films directed by J. Sasikumar